Dry Creek railway station is located on the Gawler line.

History 

First opened in 1856, the station was rebuilt in 1982 and a bogie exchange facility opened when the Adelaide-Crystal Brook line was converted to standard gauge. The exchange closed on 14 October 1996, having been made redundant by the conversion of the Adelaide to Wolseley line to standard gauge.

To the west of the station lies the Australian Rail Track Corporation standard gauge line to Crystal Brook. Dry Creek is also where the Dry Creek to Port Adelaide railway line branches off via a triangle junction allowing trains from the north and south to head towards the branch line. Also to the west of the station is a major freight terminal and marshalling yard.

The passenger service of the Dry Creek-Port Adelaide railway line, with stations at Wingfield, North Arm Road, Eastern Parade, Grand Junction Road, and Rosewater, was closed on 27–29 May 1987 (with Port Dock having closed in September 1981). Similarly, the former Northfield railway line headed east from Dry Creek to the Cavan, Pooraka, Northfield, and Stockade stations. Stockade was closed in 1961, and the rest were closed on 29 May 1987.

On 6 February 2011, a new Adelaide Metro railcar depot opened to the east of Dry Creek station to replace the facility outside of Adelaide station. The depot is the major maintenance and re-fuelling facility for the 2000 and 3000 class diesel fleets, with capacity to store 70 railcars with over 11 kilometres of track. The depot has been designed to allow future conversion to support electric rolling stock.

Services by platform

References

External links

Railway stations in Adelaide
Railway stations in Australia opened in 1856